Sturanya is a genus of land snails with an operculum. It is a genus of terrestrial gastropod mollusks in the subfamily Helicininae of the family Helicinidae.

Species
 
 Sturanya alrici (Crosse, 1888)
 Sturanya baldwini (Ancey, 1904)
 Sturanya benigna (Crosse, 1870)
 Sturanya beryllina (A. Gould, 1847)
 Sturanya carolinarum (Möllendorff, 1900)
 Sturanya dautzenbergi (A. J. Wagner, 1909)
 Sturanya delta (Pilsbry & C. M. Cooke, 1908)
 Sturanya epicharis A. J. Wagner, 1907
 Sturanya eutrochatelloides Richling, 2009
 † Sturanya exanima (Neal, 1934) 
 Sturanya gallina (Gassies, 1870)
 Sturanya gassiesiana (Crosse, 1874)
 Sturanya interna (Mousson, 1870)
 Sturanya jetschini A. J. Wagner, 1905
 † Sturanya juddii (Pilsbry & C. M. Cooke, 1908) 
 Sturanya julii (Baird, 1873)
 Sturanya kauaiensis (Pilsbry & C. M. Cooke, 1908)
 Sturanya koumacensis Richling, 2009
 Sturanya laciniosa (Mighels, 1945)
 Sturanya laeta (Crosse, 1870)
 Sturanya littoralis (Montrouzier, 1859)
 Sturanya macgillivrayi (L. Pfeiffer, 1855)
 Sturanya magdalenae (Ancey, 1890)
 Sturanya makaroaensis Richling & Bouchet, 2013
 Sturanya matutina (Neal, 1934)
 Sturanya mediana (Gassies, 1870)
 Sturanya modesta (L. Pfeiffer, 1854)
 Sturanya mouensis (Crosse, 1870)
 Sturanya multicolor (A. Gould, 1847)
 Sturanya noumeensis (Crosse, 1874)
 Sturanya oahuensis (Pilsbry & C. M. Cooke, 1908)
 Sturanya plicatilis (Mousson, 1865)
 Sturanya porphyrostoma (Crosse, 1870)
 Sturanya rossiteri (Crosse, 1895)
 Sturanya rotelloidea (Mighels, 1845)
 Sturanya rubiginosa A. J. Wagner, 1907
 Sturanya sandwichiensis (Souleyet, 1852)
 Sturanya singularis A. J. Wagner, 1907
 Sturanya sola (Neal, 1934)
 Sturanya sphaeroidea (L. Pfeiffer, 1855)
 † Sturanya stokesii (Neal, 1934) 
 Sturanya sublaevigata (L. Pfeiffer, 1852)
 Sturanya sublaevigatoides Richling, 2009
 Sturanya subsculpta (Neal, 1934)
 Sturanya tectiformis (Mousson, 1870)

Synonyms
 Sturanya novaecaledoniae (Baird, 1873): synonym of Sturanya mediana (Gassies, 1870)
 Sturanya parvula (Pease, 1868): synonym of Nesiocina parvula (Pease, 1868) (superseded combination)
 Sturanya uberta (A. A. Gould, 1847): synonym of Orobophana uberta (A. Gould, 1847) (unaccepted combination)

References

 Kobelt, W. (1905). Litteratur. Nachrichtsblatt der Deutschen Malakozoologischen Gesellschaft. 37(4): 206-212

External links
 Wagner, A. J. (1905). Helicinenstudien. Denkschriften der kaiserlichen Akademie der Wissenschaften, mathematisch-naturwissenschaftliche Klasse. 77: 357-450, pls. I-IX, Wien.
  Richling I. & Bouchet P. (2013). Extinct even before scientific recognition: a remarkable radiation of helicinid snails (Helicinidae) on the Gambier Islands, French Polynesia. Biodiversity and Conservation. 22: 2433-2468.

Helicinidae
Gastropod genera